The Bussey Institute (1883–1936) was a respected biological institute at Harvard University. It was named for Benjamin Bussey, who, in 1835, endowed the establishment of an undergraduate school of agriculture and horticulture and donated land in Jamaica Plain, Massachusetts that became the Arnold Arboretum. Bussey, a silversmith, had bought the land from the Weld family in 1806, and built a mansion in 1815. When he died, he left  to Harvard. By 1871 the Bussey Institute had been built.

Notable alumni 
James Drummond Dole obtained a bachelor in agriculture at the Bussey Institute before moving to Hawaii and developing pineapple production and the canning industry there. Alfred Kinsey, an American biologist who became famous for his work on human sexuality, studied at the Bussey Institute under famed entomologist William Morton Wheeler. Edward Murray East, a pioneer in plant genetics, also worked there when he studied Mendelian inheritance. The geneticist William E. Castle worked there from 1908 until it closed in 1936, first on the genetics of fruit flies and also on hooded rats, studying basic evolution.

References

External links
Records of the Bussey Institute

1883 establishments in Massachusetts
Harvard University
Arnold Arboretum
1994 disestablishments in Massachusetts
Defunct private universities and colleges in Massachusetts